Asemi Dam  is a gravity dam located in Kochi Prefecture in Japan. The dam is used for power production. The catchment area of the dam is 51 km2. The dam impounds about 2  ha of land when full and can store 79 thousand cubic meters of water. The construction of the dam was completed in 1972.

See also
List of dams in Japan

References

Dams in Kōchi Prefecture